Manor Park is a neighborhood in Ward 4 of northwest Washington, D.C.  
The National Capital Planning Commission 1967 "District Communities" map indicates this neighborhood is roughly bounded between 8th Street NW to the west, North Capitol Street NW, Blair Road NW, and the Washington Metropolitan Area Red Line train tracks to the east, Rittenhouse Street NW to the north, and Missouri Avenue NW to the south. Manor Park borders the adjacent neighborhoods of Takoma Park, Brightwood, and Brightwood Park in NW Washington D.C. and also borders the Riggs Park neighborhood in NE Washington D.C. In 1940, the Manor Park Citizens Association deemed the boundaries to be Eighth Street, Whittier Street, North Capitol Street, and Concord Street (now Missouri Avenue).

Residential and not very suburban, Manor Park is largely characterized by rowhouses, detached and semi-detached houses, and small neighborhood businesses. Many of the homes were built in the 1920s. There are also swaths of park land cutting through the neighborhood, including Fort Slocum Park. 
In 1923, the Manor Park Citizens Association formed to improve the neighborhood. Manor Park had mostly dirt roads until at least 1926. For many years, Manor Park was not connected by road to Takoma until Fourth and Fifth Streets were extended to connect the two neighborhoods in 1926.

Historic places
Fort Slocum (Washington, D.C.)

References

1923 establishments in Washington, D.C.
Neighborhoods in Northwest (Washington, D.C.)